Laidlaw Library may refer to:
The Laidlaw Library of the University of Leeds, England
The Laidlaw Library of University College, Toronto, Canada